The Board and Batten Miners Cabin is a historic miner's cabin located on Oddie Ave. in Tonopah, Nevada. The wood-frame cabin has board and batten siding and is topped by double pitched and shed roofs. The cabin is one of many homes built by miners on the side of Mount Oddie. Most of the miners' homes have since been destroyed, and of those that remain, the cabin is one of the most representative of the mining lifestyle.

The cabin was added to the National Register of Historic Places on May 20, 1982.

References

Houses in Nye County, Nevada
Tonopah, Nevada
Houses completed in 1905
Houses on the National Register of Historic Places in Nevada
National Register of Historic Places in Tonopah, Nevada
1905 establishments in Nevada